Alexander Michael Ring (born 9 April 1991) is a Finnish professional footballer who captains and plays as an midfielder for Major League Soccer club Austin FC.

Club career

Early career
He moved to Bonn with his family when aged three, and grew up there and in Belgium. Ring went through the ranks of Bayer 04 Leverkusen before returning to Finland with his family in 2008.

HJK
He signed for HJK's reserve team Klubi-04 in 2009, and represented them until being promoted to the first team, and signed full professional contract with the club in August 2010. However, Ring was loaned out to Tampere United for the rest of that season. He returned to HJK after the season, and was established as the first choice holding midfielder for HJK in early 2011. 
On 26 September 2011, he signed a contract extension with HJK, keeping him in the Finnish capital until 2015. During December 2011, it was rumored that German Bundesliga side Borussia Mönchengladbach were interested in signing the young Finn for approximately one million euros.

Loan to Mönchengladbach
On 5 January 2012, it was announced that Mönchengladbach had signed Ring on loan until the summer 2013, with having an option to buy at the end of the season. On 10 March 2012, Ring made his Bundesliga debut for Mönchengladbach against Freiburg, and on 21 August Ring scored his first goal for Mönchengladbach in a 1–3 defeat to Ukrainian Dynamo Kiev in the first leg of 2012–13 UEFA Champions League's playoff-round. However, despite some encouraging displays for the club, Ring soon fell out of favour, and in February 2013 it was announced that Borussia would not use their option to buy the player.

1. FC Kaiserslautern
In June 2013, he signed a contract with 1. FC Kaiserslautern to play in 2. Bundesliga. The clubs did not publish the transfer fee, but according to newspapers Kaiserslautern paid HJK Helsinki 500.000 Euros. After an encouraging start, and the club sacking of the first team coach Franco Foda in September 2013, he struggled to keep his position in the side. However, he was picked for the opening line-up in the cup games versus both Bayer Leverkusen and Bayern München. He scored his first goal for the club in August 2014 versus SV Sandhausen. Despite a lengthy lay-off due to a knee injury in the home game versus Fortuna Düsseldorf, the season 2014-15 turned out to be his best in Germany, with six goals in 24 league games. During the following seasons, Ring's performances were marred by minor injuries and constant head coach changes, that hindered his progress. In January 2017 the economically ailing club decided to let him move on before his contract would have expired.

New York City FC
Ring was purchased from 1. FC Kaiserslautern by New York City FC on January 31, 2017. Ring made himself an invaluable part of New York City's midfield during the 2017 season as he earned 29 appearances in the regular season. Despite New York City losing the Eastern Conference semifinals versus Columbus Crew, Ring's first season in MLS was a major personal success as he was elected the club's Newcomer of the Year. He scored his first MLS goal on April 15, 2018, vs. Atlanta United FC. On February 7, 2019, Ring was named the second captain in New York City FC's history, after David Villa's departure to Vissel Kobe in December.

Austin FC
On 17 December 2020, Ring was traded to new expansion side Austin FC in exchange for up to $1.25 million in General Allocation Money. He was subsequently selected as Club Captain prior to Austin FC's first league match. On 3 January 2022, Ring signed a new contract with Austin, which also made him a designated player.

International career

Ring's convincing performances in the Finnish League Cup and the Veikkausliiga earned him a call-up to the new coach Mixu Paatelainen's first gathering of the Finland national football team in May 2011. He made his senior national team debut on 7 June 2011 in 5–0 defeat against Sweden. On 11 October 2011, Finnish star Roman Eremenko described Ring as a soon-to-be key player in the Finland national football team, saying: "I knew Alex when he came to the national team, but I hadn't seen any of his games before. When he came, it was immediately obvious that he is here to stay. He plays without fear." He established himself as a regular in the national team during Finland's qualification campaign for the UEFA Euro 2012. Ring scored his first goal for the national team on 26 March 2013 in Luxembourg in a match against Luxembourg. His second international goal came from a direct freekick vs. Iceland in a WC qualifier in September 2017.

In September 2018, Ring announced his retirement from international football.

International goals

Scores and results list Finland's goal tally first.

Personal life
Ring doesn't have German citizenship, even though he has lived most of his life in Germany. In Maali! 3/2011 he stated: "I have not even applied for German citizenship. It has been obvious for me that I represent Finland".

Ring is married with two daughters.

In March 2018, Ring earned a U.S. green card which qualifies him as a domestic player for MLS roster purposes.

Career statistics

Club

International

Statistics accurate as of matches played on 2 September 2017

Honours

HJK
Veikkausliiga: 2010, 2011
Finnish Cup: 2011

Individual
Veikkausliiga Rookie of the Year: 2011
MLS All-Star: 2018

References

External links

 Alexander Ring at 1. FC Kaiserslautern 
 
 
 
 
 
 

1991 births
Living people
Swedish-speaking Finns
Finnish footballers
Finland international footballers
Finland youth international footballers
Finland under-21 international footballers
Helsingin Jalkapalloklubi players
Tampere United players
Veikkausliiga players
Borussia Mönchengladbach players
1. FC Kaiserslautern players
Bundesliga players
2. Bundesliga players
Expatriate footballers in Germany
Finnish expatriate footballers
Finnish expatriate sportspeople in Germany
Footballers from Helsinki
Association football midfielders
Klubi 04 players
New York City FC players
Major League Soccer players
Austin FC players
Designated Players (MLS)